Fu Jing was a Shang dynasty queen of Wu Ding and recipient of the Houmuwu sacrificial vessel.

Biography
Although Wu Ding reportedly had over 60 wives, he had only three queens: Fu Jing, Fu Hao, and Fu Gui. Like Wu Ding's other wives, Fu Jing participated in military expeditions and divined for the state. Some of the divinations Fu Jing conducted focused on procuring millet, so Zheng Zhenxiang has suggested that she was responsible for agricultural management. Fu Jing is often referred to in the oracle bones as Biwu.

See also
Women in ancient and imperial China

References

Chinese women in politics
13th-century BC Chinese women
13th-century BC Chinese people
13th-century BC clergy
Shang dynasty people
Chinese nobility
Women in ancient Chinese warfare
Ancient priestesses
Chinese female generals
Chinese royal consorts